Soon after their introduction in 1840 postage stamps started to be forged.

The first book about the topic was written in 1862 by Jean-Baptiste Moens from Belgium De la falsifications des timbres-poste. Shortly afterwards Edward Loines Pemberton published Forged Stamps: How to detect them and subsequently Robert Brisco Earée produced his legendary Album Weeds. Today there is an extensive literature on the forgers and their work, and examples from the most accomplished forgers sometimes sell for more than the original stamp.

Notorious and famous stamp forgers include:

 The Spiro Brothers
 Rainer Blüm
 Clive Feigenbaum; ex-chairman of Stanley Gibbons
 Sigmund Friedl
 Georges Fouré
 François Fournier
 Madame Joseph
 Louis-Henri Mercier (Henri Goegg)
 Erasmo Oneglia
 Angelo Panelli
 Mendel Shapiro
 Lucian Smeets
 Jean de Sperati
 Raoul de Thuin
 Harold Treherne
 Peter Winter

See also
 Philatelic fakes and forgeries

References

External links
 Album weeds : or, How to detect forged stamps (January 1882) Archive.org
 Forged Stamps: How to detect them  (1863) Archive.org

Stamp forgers